Nyctonympha carcharias is a species of beetle in the family Cerambycidae. It was described by Lameere in 1893, originally under the genus Hebestola. It is known from Venezuela.

References

Forsteriini
Beetles described in 1893